Alec Mansfield Tidey (born January 5, 1955) is a former professional ice hockey right wing.  He was drafted in the eighth round, 143rd overall, by the Buffalo Sabres in the 1975 NHL Amateur Draft. He was also drafted by the San Diego Mariners (sixth round, 85th overall) in the 1975 WHA Amateur Draft, and he began his professional career in the World Hockey Association with San Diego. He then moved to the National Hockey League, playing four games in two seasons with the Sabres and five in 1979–80 with the Edmonton Oilers.

In his NHL career, Tidey appeared in nine games, going scoreless. He played in seventy-four games in his one WHA season, scoring sixteen goals and adding eleven assists.

Career statistics

Regular season and playoffs

External links
 

1955 births
Living people
Buffalo Sabres draft picks
Buffalo Sabres players
Canadian ice hockey right wingers
Cincinnati Stingers (CHL) players
Edmonton Oilers players
Hershey Bears players
Houston Apollos players
Kamloops Chiefs players
Lethbridge Broncos players
San Diego Mariners draft picks
San Diego Mariners players
Ice hockey people from Vancouver
Springfield Indians players